Austrocidaris is a genus of sea urchins belonging to the family Cidaridae.

The species of this genus are found in southernmost America and New Zealand.

Species:

Austrocidaris canaliculata 
Austrocidaris lorioli 
Austrocidaris operta 
Austrocidaris pawsoni 
Austrocidaris seymourensis 
Austrocidaris spinulosa

References

Cidaridae
Cidaroida genera